Bedford bus station serves the town of Bedford, Bedfordshire, England. The bus station is part owned by the Stagecoach in Bedford and Bedford Borough Council and is situated in the town centre on All Hallows just off Greyfriars.

The main operator at Bedford bus station is Stagecoach in Bedford. Other operators include Stagecoach in Northants, Grant Palmer, Cedar Coaches, Flittabus and Ivel Sprinter.

History 
There are plans to redevelop the Bedford bus station as part of the Town Centre's renovation plan.

In June 2013, plans to rebuild the bus station were approved by the local council. The rebuilt bus station opened in March 2015.

Services
Bus services run from the bus station around the town. Services go as far afield as Kettering, Northampton, Milton Keynes, Oxford, Luton, Hitchin, Sandy, Biggleswade and Cambridge.

National Express services also call at the bus station. (Services 305 Southend-Liverpool, 314 Cambridge-Birmingham/Southport and 326 Newcastle-Cambridge)

Stagecoach X5

Gallery

References

External links
 Bus approaching Bedford bus station in 2009 - YouTube

Bus stations in England
Transport in Bedford
Buildings and structures in Bedford